Zafarnamah is an epic poem written by the Persian poet Hamdollah Mostowfi (d. 1334). The epic history, compiled in 75,000 couplets, explores Iranian history from the Arab conquest to the Mongols.

Sources 
 
  
 

 
 

Epic poems in Persian
Persian literature
Persian mythology
14th-century books